Ángel Gregorio Villoldo Arroyo (16 February 1861 – 14 October 1919) was an Argentine musician and one of the pioneers of tango music. He was lyricist, composer, and one of the major singers of the era. He is also known by the pseudonyms A. Gregorio, Fray Pimiento, Gregorio Giménez, Angel Arroyo, and Mario Reguero.  Villoldo transformed the Spanish tanguillos, the cuplés, and the habaneras, turning the continental genres into native Argentinian rhythms.

Career

Music
When performing, Villoldo often played the guitar and harmonica, and succeeded in telling stories by singing, which added to the entertainment of his audiences at ordinary cafés and joints. In 1889, he published a compilation of cantos criollos (creole folk songs), including original lyrics that were meant to be sung with guitar. In 1916, he published other songs of deep national content, titled Argentine Popular Songs, commemorating the centennial of the Argentine Declaration of Independence.

He wrote a modern method to learn guitar with symbols, called Método América, published by the old Casa América in 1917. Together with Alfredo Eusebio Gobbi and his wife, the Chilean Flora Rodríguez—parents of band leader and violinist Alfredo Gobbi—he traveled to France to make phonograph recordings, hired by Gath & Chaves, a major Argentine company of that period. This gave impetus to Argentinian music in Europe and many of these records were also distributed in Buenos Aires. His most outstanding role was as a composer. Examples of his work are the tangos "El Porteñito", "El esquinazo", "Soy tremendo", "La budinera", and "Cantar eterno", the latter recorded in 1917 by the duo of Carlos Gardel and José Razzano.

The most important piece of music Villoldo composed was "El Choclo", notable for its melody and rhythm. During World War I, the Argentine journalist Tito Livio Foppa was at the German front when, at an official party, a musician played the piano to honor Foppa and attempted to play the national anthem, but in reality the musician played "El choclo", which he mistook for Argentina's patriotic song.

Another fundamental tango for which Villoldo wrote lyrics was "La morocha"; the lyrics were written for composer Enrique Saborido, who in 1906 embarked on a ship to Europe, and this is considered the first tango to become popular in Europe. Other standout musical works by Villoldo were include "El torito", "Cuidado con los 50", "Una fija", "Yunta brava", "El cachorrito", "Pineral", "El pimpollo", "Trigo limpio", and "La bicicleta". Another of his compositions, the milonga "Matufias (O el arte de vivir)", contains a description of Argentinian history.

Other work
Besides music, Villoldo did many other things to make a living, including being a typographer, circus clown, and any other job for which his help was wanted. Among other things, he was a "cuarteador" in the neighborhoods far from downtown Buenos Aires; he waited on horseback for the arrival of a big coach or streetcar at the bottom of slopes, and then helped them get out of the mud or get uphill. This meant fastening the vehicle with a rope tied to his horse and helping in the effort.

With a knack for writing, Villoldo devised stanzas for carnival groups and numerous poems and wrote prose for well-known magazines of the time such as Caras y caretas. His work is filled with witty sarcasm, and his dialogues were suitable for the common person's tongue and always referred to real situations experienced by ordinary people, including love affairs, depicting the manner of speaking and behavior of the lowest social level of society.

Tango pieces

 "A la ciudad de Londres"
 "Amame Mucho"
 
 "Bolada de aficionado"
 "Brisas rosarinas"
 "Calandria"
 "Chiflale que va a venir"
 "Chinito"
 "Cuerpo de alambre"
 "Cuidado con los 50"
 "De farra en el cabaret"
 "Don Pedro (homage to composer Pietro Mascagni)"
 "El argentino"
 "El bohemio"
 "El cachorrito"
 "El cebollero"
 "El chichón"
 "El Choclo"
 
 "El distinguido"
 "El esquinazo"
 "El farrista"
 "El fogonazo"

 "El fogonazo"
 "El gavilán"
 "El ñato Romero"
 "El pechador"
 "El pimpollo"
 "El pinchazo"
 "El porteñito"
 "El presumido"
 "El tango de la muerte"
 "El torito"
 "La bicicleta"
 "La budinera"
 "La caprichosa"
 "La modernista"
 "La morocha (lyrics), music by Enrique Saborido"
 "La paloma"
 "La pipeta"
 "La prigueña"
 "Las tocayas"
 "Mi ñatita"
 "Miramar"
 "Muy de la bombonera"

 "Pamperito"
 "Papita pa'l loro"
 "Petit salón"
 "Pineral"
 "Prendete del brazo nena"
 "Ricotona"
 "Sacame una película gordito"
 "Soy tremendo"
 "Tan delicado el niño"
 "Tan rica la ñata"
 "Te la di chanta"
 "Trigo limpio"
 "Un mozo bien"
 "Una fija"
 "Vas a vivir mucho"
 "Yunta brava"
 "¡Qué Pamplina!"
 "¿Qué hacés Chamberguito?"
 "¡cuidado con los cincuenta!"

References

External links

 Angel Gregorio Villoldo recordings at the Discography of American Historical Recordings.

1861 births
1919 deaths
Argentine musicians
Burials at La Chacarita Cemetery
Tango lyricists
Tango musicians